Chéreau is a French surname. Notable people with the surname include:

Fabien Chéreau (born 1980), French research engineer and computer programmer
François Chéreau (1680–1729), French engraver of portraits
Jacques Chéreau (1688–1776), French portrait engraver and printmaker
Jean-Luc Chéreau (born 1948), French former racing driver 
Patrice Chéreau (1944–2013), French stage director and filmmaker

French-language surnames